Viviania is a genus of flowering plants belonging to the family Francoaceae.  

The genus is distributed across is Brazil, Argentina, Chile and Uruguay in southern South America.

Known species
As accepted by Kew;

The genus name of Viviania is in honour of Domenico Viviani (1772–1840), an Italian botanist and naturalist. It was first described and published in Anales Ci. Nat. Vol.7 on page 211 in 1804.

The genus is recognized by the United States Department of Agriculture and the Agricultural Research Service, but they do not list any known species.

References

Francoaceae
Geraniales genera
Plants described in 1804
Flora of Brazil
Flora of southern South America
Taxa named by Antonio José Cavanilles